Matteo Cesa or de Cesa (c. 1425 – after 1491) was a late-gothic style artist living in Belluno, Italy. He shows the influence of painters of the Vivarini clan. His son, Antonio, was also a painter.

Among his works:
Virgin and Child, with Saints and Angels (carved work), Santo Stefano, Belluno
Virgin and Child between SS. Matthew and Jerome, San Matteo, Belluno

References

Sources
 

Year of birth unknown
Year of death unknown
15th-century Italian painters
Italian male painters
People from Belluno
Year of birth uncertain